Siwandih is a suburb and a locality in Bokaro, Jharkhand, India.

Education
 Bokaro Public School

See also
 List of neighbourhoods of Bokaro

References 

Bokaro Steel City
Cities and towns in Bokaro district
Neighbourhoods in Jharkhand